The Sackler Library holds a large portion of the classical, art historical, and archaeological works belonging to the University of Oxford, England.

History 
The Sackler Library building was completed in 2001 and opened on 24 September of that year, enabling the rehousing of the library of the Ashmolean Museum. The library entrance is at 1 St John Street. It was principally funded by a donation from the multi-millionaire Mortimer Sackler. It was designed by Robert Adam with Paul Hanvey of ADAM Architecture. Its main building is a circular drum, a reference to the Classical origins of many of its holdings. One of the outer walls of the drum is decorated by a Classical frieze. The architects claim the circular entrance vestibule is derived from the Doric Temple of Apollo at Bassae, first excavated by Charles Robert Cockerell, the architect who designed the adjacent Ashmolean Museum. The Sackler library is administered as part of the multi-site Bodleian Library, the central libraries of the University of Oxford

Controversy
It is a controversial building (like many associated with the university) as the wealth of the eponymous funders, the Sackler family, was raised in large part from marketing Oxycontin, leading to the US opioid crisis, which has killed hundreds of thousands in the US alone. In 2018, the university said that “[We] would consider any public controversy surrounding a donor [and] may reconsider a donor in the light of new information. At present, there is no intention to reconsider the Sackler family and trusts.”

Collections 
Its holdings incorporate the collections of four older libraries, namely the Ashmolean library, the Classics Lending Library, the Eastern Art Library, the Griffith Institute and the History of Art Library. Major subject areas are:

 Western European Art since c. AD 1000
 History of Art
 Classical and Byzantine art and archaeology
 Papyrology and Greco-Roman Egypt
 Near Eastern archaeology and cuneiform languages
 Egyptology and Coptic
 Ancient history
 Epigraphy
 Classical languages and literature
 Prehistoric archaeology of Europe and North Africa
 Archaeology of Roman provinces
 Medieval European archaeology
 Theoretical and scientific archaeology
 Numismatics

Among the celebrated holdings are the Heracles Papyrus, a fragment of 3rd century Greek manuscript containing a poem about the Labours of Heracles, along with over 100,000 fragments found at Oxyrhynchus known as the Oxyrhynchus Papyri.

See also
 :Category:Sackler library manuscripts

References

External links
 Sackler Library website

Libraries of the University of Oxford
Library buildings completed in 2001
Deposit libraries
2001 establishments in England
Sackler family
New Classical architecture